Beketovka is a rural locality (a selo) in Mayachninsky Selsoviet of Ikryaninsky District, Astrakhan Oblast, Russia. The population was 393 as of 2010. There are 3 streets.

Geography 
Beketovka is located 18 km east of Ikryanoye (the district's administrative centre) by road. Ikryanoye is the nearest rural locality.

World War II
During World War II, after the Battle of Stalingrad, the largest POW camp for surrendered German forces was Camp #108 near Beketovka.

References 

Rural localities in Ikryaninsky District